Kirkland is a city in King County, Washington, United States. A suburb east of Seattle, its population was 92,175 in the 2020 U.S. census which made it the sixth largest city in the county and the twelfth largest in the state.

The city's downtown waterfront has restaurants, art galleries, a performing arts center, public parks, beaches, and a collection of public art, primarily bronze sculptures.

Kirkland was the original home of the Seattle Seahawks; the NFL team's headquarters and training facility were located at the Lake Washington Shipyard (now Carillon Point) along Lake Washington for their first ten seasons  then at nearby Northwest University through 2007. Warehouse chain Costco previously had its headquarters in Kirkland. While Costco is now headquartered in Issaquah, the city is the namesake of its "Kirkland Signature" store brand.

History
The land around Lake Washington to the east of Seattle was first settled by Native Americans of the Duwamish people also known as the "Tahb-tah-byook". Many lived between Yarrow Bay and Juanita Bay. The area had wildlife to live off of including waterfowl. Disease such as small pox eliminated a majority of the local indigenous population with the development around Lake Washington, including lowering the water level for the Ship Canal in 1916 left the remaining population to decline further.

English settlers arrived in the late 1860s, when the McGregor and Popham families built homesteads in what is now the Houghton neighborhood.  to the north people also settled near what is now called Juanita Bay, a favored campsite of the Natives because a wild potato, "wapato", thrived there. The Curtis family arrived in the area in the 1870s, followed by the French family in 1872. The Forbes family homesteaded what is now Juanita Beach Park in 1876, and settled on Rose Hill in 1877. Gradually, additional people settled in the area, and by the end of the 1880s a small number of logging, farming and boat-building communities were established.

In 1886, Peter Kirk, a British-born enterprising businessman seeking to expand the family's Moss Bay steel production company, moved to Washington after hearing that iron deposits had been discovered in the Cascade Range. Other necessary components such as limestone, needed in steel smelting, were readily available in the area. Further yet, a small number of coal mines (a required fuel source for steel mills) had recently been established nearby in Newcastle and train lines were already under construction. Plans were also underway to build the Lake Washington Ship Canal.

Kirk realized that if a town were built near the water it would be a virtual freshwater port to the sea, as well as help support any prospective mill. At the time, however, Kirk was not a U.S. citizen and could not purchase any land. Leigh S. J. Hunt, then owner of the Seattle Post-Intelligencer, offered to partner with Kirk and buy the necessary real estate.

Under their new venture, the Kirkland Land and Development Company, Kirk and Hunt purchased thousands of acres of land in what is now Kirkland's downtown in July 1888. Kirk and his associates started the construction of a new steel mill soon after, named the Moss Bay Iron and Steel Company of America. After founding the city of Kirkland in 1888, officially one of the earliest on the Eastside at the time, Kirk's vision of a "Pittsburgh of the West" was beginning to take form. Construction soon commenced on several substantial brick homes and business blocks that would house and serve the steel mill employees.

However, the Seattle, Lake Shore and Eastern Railway, which had recently been purchased by Tacoma-based Northern Pacific, had now refused to construct a rail line to the lake. This would, after all, have a negative impact on Tacoma, which was furiously competing with Seattle as the dominant Puget Sound seaport. The ensuing financial issues and numerous obstacles took a toll on Kirk, who was running out of investors. Hunt was also in debt from the purchase of land.

Nevertheless, the plans continued and the steel mill was eventually completed in late 1892 on Rose Hill (a full  from the lake's shore). Financial issues arose and due to the Panic of 1893 the mill subsequently closed without ever producing any steel. In spite of everything, Kirk was determined not to give up on his namesake town, and Kirkland was finally incorporated in 1905 with a population of approximately 532. A final attempt at a steel mill in Kirkland was planned by James A. Moore in 1906. His Northwestern Iron & Steel Company paid $250,000 in cash for a  site, but the mill never materialized. This came at the heels of the Pacific Steel Company, incorporated earlier in 1906 by J.F. Duthie, William Calvert and L.S. Cragin. This company soon amounted to nothing.

In 1900, the Curtis family made a living operating a ferry-construction business on Lake Washington. Along with Captain John Anderson, the Curtises were among the first to run ferries in the area. Leschi, first operated on December 27, 1913, was the original wooden ferry to transport automobiles and people between the Eastside and Madison Park until her retirement in 1950. The ferry operations ran nearly continuously for 18 hours each day. The construction of the first Lake Washington floating bridge in 1940, however, made ferry service unprofitable and eventually led to its cancellation. Subsequent years saw wool milling and warship building become the major industries.

The first woolen mill in the state of Washington was built in Kirkland in 1892. The mill was the primary supplier of wool products for the Alaska Gold Rush prospectors and for the U.S. military during World War I. By 1917, after the completion of the Lake Washington Ship Canal, the construction of ocean-going vessels had become a major business. By 1940, the thriving Lake Washington Shipyard had constructed more than 25 warships during World War II for the U.S. Navy, on what is now Carillon Point.

Annexations

Since the incorporation of Kirkland in 1905, the city has grown to approximately 12 times its original geographic boundaries, nearly doubling in size during the 1940s and 1960s.

Kirkland consolidated with the neighboring town of Houghton on July 31, 1968, to form one city of 13,500. It annexed the neighborhood of Totem Lake in 1974, and the neighborhoods of South Juanita, North Rose Hill, and South Rose Hill in 1988, which were the largest annexations undertaken in Washington in nearly two decades. This added a further 16,119 people to Kirkland's population and was responsible for 76 percent of Kirkland's population increase between 1980 and 1990.

On November 3, 2009, responding to a county initiative to encourage cities to annex or incorporate many of the unincorporated areas within the county, as well as a state sales tax incentive intended to ease the process, three previously unincorporated districts north of the city—Finn Hill, North Juanita, and Kingsgate—voted on whether to annex to Kirkland. The measure failed by seven votes to reach the 60% margin, which was required because the measure included accepting a share of the city's voter-approved debt. However, since the affirmative vote was over 50%, the city council could and did vote to accept the annexation, without the assumption of debt.

For a 10-year period from 2011 to 2021, the city was eligible and filed annually for a special Annexation State Sales Tax Credit (ASTC) from the State of Washington to bridge the millions of dollars deficit in providing municipal services in the annexation area. The ASTC expired in 2021.

Geography
Kirkland is bordered to the west by Lake Washington, to the east by Redmond, to the south by Bellevue, and to the north by Kenmore, Woodinville, and Bothell.

Kirkland is accessible via Interstate 405, which connects it with other Eastside cities, including Bellevue, Renton, and Bothell. Seattle, which is west of Kirkland, as well as Redmond to the east, are both accessible through State Highway 520.

Climate

Demographics

According to the U.S. Census Bureau QuickFacts for 2019, the median income for a household in the city was $117,190. The per capita income for the city was $63,135.

2020 census
According to the U.S. Census Bureau QuickFacts for 2020, there were 92,175 people residing in the city. Additional demographics breakouts are not yet available.

2010 census
As of the census of 2010, there were 48,787 people, 22,445 households, and 12,014 families residing in the city. The racial makeup of the city was 79.3% White, 1.8% African American, 0.4% Native American, 11.3% Asian, 0.3% Pacific Islander, 2.5% from other races, and 4.5% from two or more races. Hispanic or Latino of any race were 6.3% of the population.

There were 22,445 households, of which 24.6% had children under the age of 18 living with them, 42.3% were married couples living together, 7.6% had a female householder with no husband present, 3.6% had a male householder with no wife present, and 46.5% were non-families. 36.0% of all households were made up of individuals, and 8.4% had someone living alone who was 65 years of age or older. The average household size was 2.15 and the average family size was 2.83.

The median age in the city was 37.5 years. 18.8% of residents were under the age of 18; 8.2% were between the ages of 18 and 24; 35.1% were from 25 to 44; 27% were from 45 to 64; and 10.9% were 65 years of age or older. The gender makeup of the city was 48.7% male and 51.3% female.

2000 census
As of the census of 2000, there were 45,054 people, 20,736 households, and 11,031 families residing in the city. The population density was 4,220.3 people per square mile (1,628.8/km2). There were 21,831 dwelling units at an average density of 2,045.0 per square mile (789.2/km2). The racial makeup of the city was 85.28% White, 1.59% African American, 0.53% Native American, 7.80% Asian, 0.20% Pacific Islander, 1.69% from other races, and 2.92% from two or more races. Hispanics or Latinos, who may be of any race, were 4.11% of the population.

There were 20,736 households, out of which 23.3% had children under the age of 18 living with them, 42.0% were married couples living together, 8.1% had a female householder with no husband present, and 46.8% were non-families. 35.6% of all households were made up of individuals, and 6.7% had someone living alone who was 65 years of age or older. The average household size was 2.13 and the average family size was 2.80.

In the city, the population was spread out, with 18.5% under the age of 18, 9.3% from 18 to 24, 38.1% from 25 to 44, 23.9% from 45 to 64, and 10.2% who were 65 years of age or older. The median age was 36 years. For every 100 females, there were 94.8 males. For every 100 females age 18 and over, there were 92.8 males.

The median income for a household in the city was $60,332, and the median income for a family was $73,395. Males had a median income of $50,691 versus $39,737 for females. The per capita income for the city was $38,903.  About 3.9% of families and 5.3% of the population were below the poverty line, including 6.3% of those under age 18 and 5.0% of those age 65 or over.

Arts and culture

Kirkland had a gallery district downtown until recent years when all but three galleries closed or moved away.  The Kirkland Performance Center hosts a number of performing arts events. The Kirkland Arts Center, located in the historic Peter Kirk Building on Market Street, provides classes, workshops and community-oriented gallery space.

Kirkland hosted the annual Kirkland Concours d'Elegance at Carillon Point from 2003 until 2011, showing vintage and classic automobiles (and wooden boats) from across the country. The Porsche Club of America now hosts an annual Porsche car show at the Carillon Point location every September.

Teen Union Building
The Kirkland Teen Union Building (KTUB) in downtown Peter Kirk Park is supported by the city and a number of nonprofit organizations.  It has two music stages, a recording studio, darkroom and year-round activities and programs for youth.

Sports
The local Lake Washington High School lacrosse team defeated intercity rival Juanita High School in the state championship 8–7 in 2015 to secure a state title.

The Lake Washington High school Baseball team won the first ever State Championship (3A) in school history during 2016, defeating Lakeside School 2–0.

Kirkland FC is an amateur soccer club in the Western Washington Premier League, which began play in 2018. They are referred to as the Goats.

Seahawks
Kirkland was the original home of the Seattle Seahawks; the NFL team's headquarters and training facility were located at the Lake Washington Shipyard (now Carillon Point) along Lake Washington for their first ten seasons  then at nearby Northwest University through 2007.

Little League
Kirkland has two Little Leagues: Kirkland American Little League and Kirkland National Little League. Kirkland National won the 1982 Little League World Series championship. They defeated a team from Taiwan 6–0 on August 28, 1982.

The Kirkland Baseball Commission provides recreational baseball for players ages 13–18. It is affiliated with the national Pony Baseball organization.

The 1982 Kirkland National Little League team won the Little League World Series in Williamsport, Pennsylvania. That event is the subject of the ESPN 30 for 30 documentary Little Big Men. It also was the home to Little League's 1992 Big League Softball World Series Champions representing the Eastside District Nine Leagues. Since 1999, Kirkland has been the home of the Little League Junior Softball World Series held each August at Kirkland's Everest Park.

Parks and recreation

During the summer, residents of neighboring cities flock to Kirkland to visit Kirkland's many waterfront parks on Lake Washington. Kirkland has neighborhood parks as well, contains a corner of Saint Edward State Park, and abuts the equestrian Bridle Trails State Park. The waterfront parks are linked by a gravel trail, which is open until dusk. Juanita Beach Park is another major park in Kirkland, and is a tourist attraction. The Cross Kirkland Corridor is a rail-trail that roughly bisects the city.

Government

Kirkland has a council–manager form of government, with a city manager hired by the city council. The seven councilmembers are elected at-large for staggered four-year terms in non-partisan elections. The city council selects a mayor from among its members, who serves as council chair but has no veto power. , the mayor is Penny Sweet and the city manager is former King County Executive Kurt Triplett.

Education
The majority of Kirkland is part of the Lake Washington School District, which also serves other communities. The school district operates two high schools, Juanita and Lake Washington, within Kirkland city limits as well as five middle schools and thirteen elementary schools.

A portion is in the Bellevue School District and another portion is in the Northshore School District.

The city is also home to several private schools, including Puget Sound Adventist Academy and Eastside Preparatory School, as well as several public magnet schools including the Environmental and Adventure Jr. High School, International Community School, B.E.S.T. High School, and Northstar Jr. High.

Kirkland is home to Lake Washington Technical College and Northwest University, a small Christian college. Additionally, Kirkland is bordered on the northwest by the campus of Bastyr University (which is technically in Kenmore).

Economy 
According to the city's 2020 Comprehensive Annual Financial Report, the top employers in the city are:

Media
Kirkland is served by several news sources, including:
 The Seattle Times, the largest daily newspaper in the Seattle metro area. It is designated the city of Kirkland's official newspaper of record.
 The Kirkland Reporter (formerly the Kirkland Courier), an online weekly publication of Sound Publishing (Black Press).
 The City Update Newsletter, the city's official newsletter. It provides information about city programs, legislative updates and neighborhood highlights.
 Currently Kirkland, the city's official video news segment. It airs every two weeks on Kirkland's two local TV stations: K Life and K Gov.

Infrastructure

Transportation

In 2006, Kirkland was the first city in Washington to adopt a Complete Streets ordinance, whereby pedestrian and bicycle facilities are addressed as a part of all road construction and improvement planning projects. Kirkland passed an Active Transportation Plan in 2009 specifically targeting improvements to pedestrian, bicycle, and equestrian facilities.

Kirkland is served by King County Metro and Sound Transit Express buses that converge in Downtown Kirkland, the Totem Lake neighborhood, and South Kirkland. The city also has several park and ride facilities along Interstate 405. Buses connect Kirkland to Bellevue, Seattle, Redmond, Bothell, Kenmore, and Woodinville.

As part of Sound Transit 3, Kirkland is slated to receive a short Link light rail line from Issaquah and Downtown Bellevue that will terminate at South Kirkland Park and Ride. Originally scheduled to open in 2041, due to projected revenue declines resulting from the COVID-19 pandemic, the Sound Transit Board issued a Sound Transit 3 "reallignment" plan on August 5, 2021, which delays the Issaquah to South Kirkland light rail line to 2044. The Sound Transit 3 program also includes a bus rapid transit line on Interstate 405, with stops at NE 85th Street and the existing Totem Lake Freeway Station. The NE 85th Street station is projected to cost $235–300 million, making it one of the most expensive bus projects under consideration by Sound Transit, due to the need to completely rebuild the cloverleaf interchange. The city's existing transit center about a mile away and about  lower in elevation could be connected with the first aerial tramway in the Seattle area. The station was originally planned to open in 2024 after three years of construction, but Sound Transit is delaying opening to 2026 due to revenue declines as a result of the COVID-19 pandemic.

Health care
Kirkland is served by EvergreenHealth, a public healthcare system that operates a 318-bed hospital complex near Totem Lake. It was founded in 1967 and opened the first phase of Evergreen General Hospital in 1972.

COVID-19 pandemic
The city was the first in the country to suffer a cluster of cases of Coronavirus disease 2019 during the COVID-19 pandemic, including the first six U.S. fatalities. Many of the confirmed cases originated from a Life Care Centers of America nursing home in Kirkland.

Notable people
 Dorothy Anstett, Miss Washington USA 1968 and Miss USA 1968
 Mark Arm, musician in the bands Green River and Mudhoney
 Chris Bingham, race car driver
 Gail Brodsky, tennis player
 Mitchie Brusco, professional skateboarder
 Dori Hillestad Butler, children's author, resides in Kirkland
 Deb Caletti, author, young adult and adult fiction
 David DeCastro, lineman for Pittsburgh Steelers
 Tom Evans, MLB baseball (Toronto Blue Jays, Texas Rangers)
 Ryan Hall, retired runner, holder of U.S. half marathon record
 Marion Hutton, singer and actress
 Ken Lehman, MLB pitcher (Brooklyn Dodgers, Baltimore Orioles, Philadelphia Phillies)
 Ally Maki, actress 
 Rick May, voice actor and theatrical director and actor
 Michael O'Hearn, bodybuilder, actor and model
 Robin Pecknold, singer, lead songwriter of Fleet Foxes
 Jennie Reed, champion track cyclist and Olympian (2004, 2008, 2012)
Cher Scarlett, software developer and activist
 Travis Snider, MLB baseball (Toronto Blue Jays, Pittsburgh Pirates, Baltimore Orioles, Arizona Diamondbacks)
 Rosalynn Sumners, World and National champion figure skater, Olympic silver medalist (1984)
 Johnny Whitney, singer and musician
 Lana Wilson, filmmaker

Sister city
Kirkland has one sister city:

 Emmerich am Rhein, Germany (1995)

See also
 List of companies based in Kirkland, Washington

References

External links

 City of Kirkland Government

 
Cities in Washington (state)
Cities in King County, Washington
Cities in the Seattle metropolitan area
Populated places established in 1888